Menahem or Menachem was a Jewish king.

Menahem or Menachem may also refer to:

 Menachem or Manahen or Manaen, a teacher of the early Christian Church who, according to Acts 13:1, had been brought up with Herod the tetrarch
 Menahem the Essene, sage of the Second Temple period
 Menahem (Khazar), Khazar ruler
 Menachem Begin (1913–1992), 6th Prime Minister of Israel
 Menahem Ben (born 1948), Israeli poet and journalist 
 Menahem ben Ammiel, character in apocalyptic Jewish texts
 Menahem ben Judah, Jewish messiah claimant of the Second Temple period (may be the same person as Menahem ben Hezekiah)
 Menahem ben Saruq, medieval poet and philologist
 Menachem Ben-Sasson (born 1951), Israeli politician and president of Hebrew University of Jerusalem
 Menahem ben Solomon, medieval rabbi and author
 Menahem Azariah da Fano (1548–1620), Italian Talmudist and Kabbalist
 Menahem Saleh Daniel (1846–1940), Iraqi philanthropist
 Menahem Degani (1927–2018), Israeli basketball player
 Menachem Fisch, Israeli philosopher
 Menahem Gnessin (1882–1952), Russian-Israeli actor and Hebrew instructor 
 Menahem Golan (1929–2014), Israeli film producer
 Menahem Shemuel Halevy (1884–1940), Iranian rabbi
 Menahem ben Aaron ibn Zerah (died 1385), Spanish rabbi 
 Menachem Ilan (born 1960), Israeli Olympic sport shooter
 Menahem Lonzano, Masoreric scholar
 Menachem Magidor (born 1946), Israeli mathematician, president of the Hebrew University of Jerusalem
 Menahem Pressler (born 1923), American pianist
 Menahem Rabinovich (1934–2012), Israeli biochemist
 Menahem Recanati (1223–1290), Italian rabbi and Kabbalist
 Menahem Max Schiffer (1911–1997), American mathematician 
 Menachem Stark (1974–2014), American businessman who was kidnapped and murdered in a botched robbery
 Menahem Stern (1925–1989), Israeli historian
 Menahem Yaari (born 1935), Israeli economist

Other 
 Menachem Av, a Hebrew month

See also 
 Menachem Mendel, a given name